Bakkum is a village in the Dutch province of North Holland. It is a part of the municipality of Castricum and lies about 12 km southwest of Alkmaar.

The village was first mentioned in the late-11th century as Bachem, and means "settlement on a height". Bakkum used to be a heerlijkheid. In 1749, it was sold to Nicolaas Geelvinck who was Lord of Castricum among others.

In 1812, Bakkum became a part of the municipality of Castricum. Some tourism developed in the early 20th century, but Bakkum never developed into a seaside resort town. After World War II, it started to form a single urban area with Castricum.

Gallery

References

Populated places in North Holland
Castricum